The Obelisk of Theodosius is the Ancient Egyptian obelisk of Pharaoh Thutmose III re-erected in the Hippodrome of Constantinople (known today as At Meydanı or Sultanahmet Meydanı, in the modern city of Istanbul, Turkey) by the Roman emperor Theodosius I in the 4th century AD.

History
The obelisk was first erected during the 18th dynasty by Pharaoh Thutmose III (1479–1425 BC) to the south of the seventh pylon of the great temple of Karnak. The Roman emperor Constantius II (337–361 AD) had it and another obelisk transported along the river Nile to Alexandria to commemorate his ventennalia or 20 years on the throne in 357. The other obelisk was erected on the spina of the Circus Maximus in Rome in the autumn of that year, and is now known as the Lateran Obelisk. The obelisk that would become the obelisk of Theodosius remained in Alexandria until 390; when Theodosius I (379–395 AD) had it transported to Constantinople and put up on the spina of the Hippodrome there.

Description

Obelisk
The Obelisk of Theodosius is of red granite from Aswan and was originally 30m tall, like the Lateran Obelisk.  The lower part was damaged in antiquity, probably during its transport or re-erection, and so the obelisk is today only 18.54m (or 19.6m) high, or 25.6m if the base is included.  Between the four corners of the obelisk and the pedestal are four bronze cubes, used in its transportation and re-erection.

Each of its four faces has a single central column of inscription, celebrating Thutmose III's victory over the Mitanni which took place on the banks of the Euphrates in about 1450 BC.

Pedestal

The marble pedestal had bas-reliefs dating to the time of the obelisk's re-erection in Constantinople.  On one face Theodosius I is shown offering the crown of victory to the winner in the chariot races, framed between arches and Corinthian columns, with happy spectators, musicians and dancers assisting in the ceremony.  In the bottom right of this scene is the water organ of Ctesibius and on the left another instrument.

There are obvious traces of major damage to the pedestal and energetic restoration of it.  Missing pieces have been replaced, at the pedestal's bottom corners, by cubes of porphyry resting on the bronze cubes already mentioned – the bronze and porphyry cubes are of identical form and dimensions.  There is also a vertical gash up one of the obelisk's faces, which looks like a canal from above.  These repairs to the base may be linked to the cracking of the obelisk itself after its suffering a serious accident (perhaps an earthquake) at an unknown date in antiquity.

Inscriptions

The pedestal's east face bears an inscription in five Latin hexameters. This is slightly broken at the bottom but it was transcribed in full by travellers in the 16th century.  It reads:

 DIFFICILIS QVONDAM DOMINIS PARERE SERENIS
 IVSSVS ET EXTINCTIS PALMAM PORTARE TYRANNIS
 OMNIA THEODOSIO CEDVNT SVBOLIQVE PERENNI
 TER DENIS SIC VICTVS EGO DOMITVSQVE DIEBVS
 IVDICE SVB PROCLO SVPERAS ELATVS AD AVRAS

Translation:

"Formerly [I was] reluctant to obey peaceful masters, and ordered to carry the palm [of victory] for tyrants now vanquished and forgotten. [But] all things yield to Theodosius and to his eternal offspring. So too was I prevailed over and tamed in three times ten days, raised towards the skies under governor Proculus."

On the west face the same idea is repeated in two elegiac couplets rendered in Byzantine Greek, though this time it reports that the re-erection took 32 days (TPIAKONTA ΔYO, last line) not 30:

 KIONA TETPAΠΛEYPON AEI XΘONI KEIMENON AXΘOC
 MOYNOC ANACTHCAI ΘEYΔOCIOC BACIΛEYC
 TOΛMHCAC ΠPOKΛOC EΠEKEKΛETO KAI TOCOC ECTH
 KIΩN HEΛIOIC EN TPIAKONTA ΔΥΩ

Translation:
"This column with four sides which lay on the earth, only the emperor Theodosius dared to lift again its burden; Proclos was invited to execute his order; and this great column stood up in 32 days."

See also
 List of Egyptian obelisks
 Walled Obelisk

References

Bibliography
 Labib Habachi, The Obelisks of Egypt, skyscrapers of the past, American University in Cairo Press, 1985, 
 "Obelisk of Theodosius", in volume 3 of Alexander Kazhdan (ed.), The Oxford Dictionary of Byzantium, 3 volumes, Oxford University Press, 1991, 
  Jean-Pierre Sodini, "Images sculptées et propagande impériale du IVe au VIe siècles : recherches récentes sur les colonnes honorifiques et les reliefs politiques à Byzance", Byzance et les images, La Documentation Française, Paris, 1994, pp. 43–94.
 Bente Kiilerich, The Obelisk Base in Constantinople: Court Art and Imperial Ideology, Rome, 1998 (ActaIRN vol. X; Giorgio Bretschneider)
 E. A. Wallis Budge, Cleopatra's Needles and Other Egyptian Obelisks, The Religious Tract Society, London, 1926
 Linda Safran, "Points of View: The Theodosian Obelisk Base in Context." Greek, Roman, and Byzantine Studies 34, no. 4 (Winter 1993), pp. 409–435.

Further reading
Weitzmann, Kurt, ed., Age of spirituality : late antique and early Christian art, third to seventh century, no. 99, 1979, Metropolitan Museum of Art, New York, ; full text available on-line from The Metropolitan Museum of Art Libraries

External links
Over 60 pictures

Obelisks of the World

Theodosius
Theodosius
Relocated Egyptian obelisks
Latin inscriptions
Byzantine Greek inscriptions
Victory monuments
Hippodrome of Constantinople
4th-century Roman sculptures
15th-century BC steles
Thutmose III
Theodosius I